The following lists events from 2016 in Malta.

Incumbents
President: Marie Louise Coleiro Preca
Prime Minister: Joseph Muscat
Speaker: Angelo Farrugia

Events
February 5-9 - The 2016 Carnival was held and became the earliest carnival schedule to date.
May 10-14 - Malta participacted in the Eurovision Song Contest 2016
4 June – Independent MP Marlene Farrugia establishes the Democratic Party.
17 June – MaltaPost inaugurates the Malta Postal Museum in Valletta.
24 October - French Fairchild Metroliner crash: a CAE Aviation Fairchild SA227-AT twin turboprop, registration  crashed on take-off a short distance from the runway. All five people on board died in the accident. The aircraft was taking part in a French-led surveillance operation to counter people smuggling.

Deaths
21 March – Joseph Mercieca, 87, Archbishop of Malta

See also
Malta in the Eurovision Song Contest 2016

References

 
Years of the 21st century in Malta
Malta
2010s in Malta
Malta